A non-binding referendum on membership for the European Union was held in Sweden on 13 November 1994.

The voter turnout was 83.3%, and the result was 52.3% for and 46.8% against.

Result
Source: NationalencyklopedinSee also: Swedish Election Authority

By county

See also
Referendums in Sweden

References

Referendums in Sweden
Sweden
1994 elections in Sweden
Sweden and the European Union
Referendums related to European Union accession
November 1994 events in Europe